Claude Liauzu (April 24, 1940 in Casablanca, Morocco – May 23, 2007), was a French historian specializing in the history of colonialism. He was an ardent critic of the French law of February 23, 2005 of the teaching of French colonial empires describing the colonization positively. He was professor at the Sorbonne (Université de Paris VII - Denis-Diderot).

Works
 Colonisation. Droit d’inventaire, Paris, Armand Colin, 2004

External links
C. Liauzu: Une loi contre l’histoire
Text of the law
Université de Paris VII - Denis-Diderot
Obituary 

1940 births
Academic staff of the University of Paris
2007 deaths
French male non-fiction writers
20th-century French historians
20th-century French male writers